The 2003 NCAA Division I Cross Country Championships were the 65th annual NCAA Men's Division I Cross Country Championship and the 23rd annual NCAA Women's Division I Cross Country Championship to determine the team and individual national champions of NCAA Division I men's and women's collegiate cross country running in the United States. In all, four different titles were contested: men's and women's individual and team championships.

Held on November 24, 2003, the combined meet was hosted by the University of Northern Iowa at Irv Warren Golf Course in Waterloo, Iowa, near UNI's campus in Cedar Falls. The distance for the men's race was 10 kilometers (6.21 miles) while the distance for the women's race was 6 kilometers (3.73 miles). 

The men's team championship was again won by Stanford (24 points), the Cardinal's second consecutive and fourth overall. This was the second best score in NCAA history and the lowest by a team of entirely American runners.  UTEP's 17 point win in 1981 was accomplished with a team of African runners.  Stanford placed 6 runners in the top 13 places.  The women's team championship was also won by Stanford (120 points), the Cardinal's second and first since 1996. This was the third time that the same university won both team titles; Stanford accomplished this feat in 1996 and Wisconsin captured both in 1985.

The two individual champions were, for the men, Dathan Ritzenhein (Colorado, 29:14.1) and, for the women, Shalane Flanagan (North Carolina, 19:30.4). It was Flanagan's second consecutive title.

Men's title
Distance: 10,000 meters

Men's Team Result (Top 10)

Men's Individual Result (Top 10)

Women's title
Distance: 6,000 meters

Women's Team Result (Top 10)

Women's Individual Result (Top 10)

References
 

NCAA Cross Country Championships
NCAA Division I Cross Country Championships
Iowa Hawkeyes Iowa
NCAA Division I Cross Country Championships
Waterloo, Iowa
Track and field in Iowa